Zhang Zhaohui (born 12 January 1989) is a Chinese former footballer.

Career statistics

Club

Notes

References

1989 births
Living people
Chinese footballers
Association football midfielders
Singapore Premier League players
Chongqing Liangjiang Athletic F.C. players